Muskan Sumika is a Bangladeshi costume designer. He won the Bangladesh National Film Award for Best Costume Design for the film Podmo Patar Jol (2018).

Filmography
 Podmo Patar Jol - 2015
 Rajneeti - 2017

Awards and nominations
National Film Awards

References

External links
 

Living people
Bangladeshi costume designers
Year of birth missing (living people)